Phupu Lhamu Khatri (born 5 October 1996) is a Nepali female judoka and Olympian. She won a gold medal for Nepal at the 2016 South Asian Games, and went on to bag the Female Player of the Year Award at the NSJF Pulsar Sports Award in the same year.

Khatri has been playing for the senior team since 2012. She claimed a silver medal in Ranking Judo held in Hong Kong in 2015. In the same year, she claimed bronze in the JUA Junior Championship held in Macau. For her gold medal haul in SAG, she eased past her opponents from Sri Lanka, Bangladesh, and Pakistan by ippon before beating an Indian opponent for gold.

Khatri represented Nepal in the Judo at the 2016 Summer Olympics – Women's 63 kg category at the 2016 Summer Olympics. She was defeated by Maricet Espinosa of Cuba in the round of 32. In light of her excellent performance in the South Asian Games, she was also chosen to be the flag bearer for Nepal at the 2016 Summer Olympics Parade of Nations.

Early life

Khatri was born in a remote village of Lelep in Taplejung. Her father, Dorje Khatri, was a trekking entrepreneur who died in 2015 Mount Everest avalanches. As a child, she was drawn to judo and had joined the Multi-Purpose Martial Arts Center in Nayabazar, Kathmandu.

References

External links
 

1996 births
Living people
People from Taplejung District
Olympic judoka of Nepal
Nepalese female judoka
Judoka at the 2016 Summer Olympics
Judoka at the 2014 Asian Games
Judoka at the 2018 Asian Games
South Asian Games gold medalists for Nepal
Asian Games competitors for Nepal
South Asian Games medalists in judo